Pietro Paolo Borrono, or Petro Paulo da Milano or Petter Paul Borrono (born about 1490, Milan - died 1563) was an Italian composer and lutenist of the renaissance.

Known works
 1536  (Milan: Giovanni Antonio Casteliono), seven of the nineteen pieces in this anthology are by Borrono
 1546  (Venice: Girolamo Scotto), a shared volume, also containing pieces by Francesco Canova da Milano.  This is book two of Scotto's ten-volume series of lute tablatures.  A German edition of this book was published in 1550 by Rudolf Wissenbach of Zürich.
 1546 , Antonio Casteliono
 1548  (Venice: Girolamo Scotto), a collection of pavanes. This is book eight of Scotto's ten-volume series of lute tablatures.
 1563  (Venice: Girolamo Scotto), a collection of dance music

References

Sources
 Oscar Chilesotti Note circa alcuni liutisti italiani della prima metà del Cinquecento (Milan, 1902).
 Geo Pistarino Un episodio della vita di Pietro Paolo Borrono  (1949)

Italian classical composers
Renaissance composers
Italian male classical composers
16th-century classical composers
16th-century Italian musicians